Oliver Locke  is a British television personality and actor from Southampton, England, known for appearing in E4's constructed reality series Made in Chelsea. His mother is former BBC Radio Solent DJ Sarah Locke.

Career
Whilst on Made in Chelsea, Locke came out as bisexual, and then later came out as gay. At about the same time he wrote a book called Laid in Chelsea, which spent eight weeks at number 3 of The Sunday Times Best Seller list.

In January 2014, Locke became a housemate in the thirteenth series of Celebrity Big Brother. He finished in third place behind Dappy and winner Jim Davidson.

Locke has been seen on such shows as Celebrity Juice, Alan Carr's Chatty Man, The Jonathan Ross Show, Britain's Got More Talent, The Xtra Factor, Do the Dishes, the twelfth series of 8 Out of 10 Cats and the second series of Fake Reaction.

In 2016, Locke and his co-founders Jack Rogers and Maxim Cheremkhin founded the gay dating app Chappy.

In 2018, Locke landed his first Hollywood film. Directed by Michael Winterbottom, Greed follows the life of a billionaire retail magnate whose wife doesn't understand him.

In 2022, Locke appeared as a contestant on Celebrity Hunted. He was the first candidate caught in the series.

References

1987 births
Living people
English gay actors
British LGBT broadcasters
People from Chelsea, London
Male actors from Southampton
Television personalities from Hampshire
Television personalities from London
Mass media people from Southampton
Made in Chelsea